Bicyclus dubia, the dubious scalloped bush brown, is a butterfly in the family Nymphalidae. It is found in Cameroon, the Central African Republic, the southern part of the Democratic Republic of the Congo, western Uganda, north-western Tanzania and north-western Zambia. The habitat consists of swamp and riverine forests.

Adults are attracted to fermented bananas.

The larvae feed on Poaceae species.

References

Elymniini
Butterflies described in 1893
Butterflies of Africa